Diboll  is a city in Angelina County, Texas, United States. The population was 4,457 at the 2020 census. Diboll is named for J. C. Diboll, a local timber salesman.

Geography

Diboll is located in southwestern Angelina County at  (31.186060, –94.785395). U.S. Route 59 (future Interstate 69) passes through the city, leading north  to Lufkin, the county seat, and south  to Houston.

Demographics

As of the 2020 United States census, there were 4,457 people, 1,353 households, and 1,181 families residing in the city.

As of the census of 2000, there were 5,470 people, 1,424 households, and 1,107 families residing in the city. The population density was 1,141.9 people per square mile (440.9/km2). There were 1,582 housing units at an average density of 330.3 per square mile (127.5/km2). The racial makeup of the city was 53.67% White, 24.13% African American, 0.53% Native American, 0.05% Asian, 0.05% Pacific Islander, 19.40% from other races, and 2.16% from two or more races. Hispanic or Latino of any race were 37.26% of the population.

There were 1,424 households, out of which 43.4% had children under the age of 18 living with them, 54.4% were married couples living together, 19.2% had a female householder with no husband present, and 22.2% were non-families. 20.6% of all households were made up of individuals, and 10.0% had someone living alone who was 65 years of age or older. The average household size was 3.08 and the average family size was 3.57.

In the city, the population was spread out, with 27.2% under the age of 18, 10.7% from 18 to 24, 33.8% from 25 to 44, 19.6% from 45 to 64, and 8.7% who were 65 years of age or older. The median age was 32 years. For every 100 females, there were 132.7 males. For every 100 females age 18 and over, there were 143.3 males.

The median income for a household in the city was $28,183, and the median income for a family was $31,524. Males had a median income of $29,156 versus $18,324 for females. The per capita income for the city was $10,707. About 24.0% of families and 26.0% of the population were below the poverty line, including 34.4% of those under age 18 and 17.6% of those age 65 or over.

Notable people 

 Jermichael Finley, former Green Bay Packers football tight end (retired in 2015)
 John H. Hannah, Jr., former Texas Secretary of State and United States federal judge
 Mack Mitchell, former football defensive end for the Cleveland Browns
 Arthur "Buddy" Temple, Jr., former member of the Texas House of Representatives and Texas Railroad Commission; President and CEO of Temple Industries (later Temple-Inland), a major forest products manufacturer

Education
Diboll is served by the Diboll Independent School District.

Climate
The climate in this area is characterized by hot, humid summers and generally mild to cool winters.  According to the Köppen Climate Classification system, Diboll has a humid subtropical climate, abbreviated "Cfa" on climate maps.

References

External links

 City of Diboll official website
 The Handbook of Texas Online
Historic photos of Diboll at The Portal to Texas History

Cities in Angelina County, Texas
Cities in Texas